Tropicoseius is a genus of mites in the family Ascidae.

Species
 Tropicoseius adsimilis (Fain & Hyland, 1980)      
 Tropicoseius analis (Fain & Hyland, 1980)      
 Tropicoseius bellavistensis (Wiese & Fain, 1993)      
 Tropicoseius berryi Naskrecki & Colwell, 1998      
 Tropicoseius bisacculatus (Fain, Hyland & Aitken, 1977)      
 Tropicoseius carlosalberti (Wiese & Fain, 1993)      
 Tropicoseius cervus Naskrecki & Colwell, 1998      
 Tropicoseius chazdonae Naskrecki & Colwell, 1998      
 Tropicoseius chlorestes (Fain, Hyland & Aitken, 1977)      
 Tropicoseius columbiensis (Fain & Hyland, 1980)      
 Tropicoseius colwelli (Hunter, 1972)      
 Tropicoseius erioxynon Naskrecki & Colwell, 1998      
 Tropicoseius fidelis (OConnor, Colwell & Naeem, 1997)      
 Tropicoseius fuentesi Naskrecki & Colwell, 1998      
 Tropicoseius kaliszewskii Naskrecki & Colwell, 1998      
 Tropicoseius klepticos (OConnor, Colwell & Naeem, 1997)      
 Tropicoseius kressi Naskrecki & Colwell, 1998      
 Tropicoseius naeemi Naskrecki & Colwell, 1998      
 Tropicoseius ochoai Naskrecki & Colwell, 1998      
 Tropicoseius ornatus (Fain & Hyland, 1980)      
 Tropicoseius perezgloriae (Wiese & Fain, 1993)      
 Tropicoseius phoreticus (Fain, Hyland & Aitken, 1977)      
 Tropicoseius rowelli Naskrecki & Colwell, 1998      
 Tropicoseius steini Naskrecki & Colwell, 1998      
 Tropicoseius trinitatis (Fain, Hyland & Aitken, 1977)      
 Tropicoseius uniformis (Fain, Hyland & Aitken, 1977)

References

Ascidae